Embers of War: The Fall of an Empire and the Making of America's Vietnam is a 2012 book by the Cornell University historian Fredrik Logevall, which won the 2013 Pulitzer Prize for History.  It also won the inaugural American Library in Paris Book Award and the 2013 Arthur Ross Book Award and was a runner-up for the Cundill Prize. The book covers the Vietnam conflict right from the 1919 Versailles Peace Conference till 1959, when the first Americans soldiers are killed in an ambush near Saigon in Vietnam, focusing on the Indochina War between France and the Viet Minh.

Reviews
 Alan Brinkley. The New York Times.
 Scott Midgley. Reviews in History.

References 

2012 non-fiction books
21st-century history books
Pulitzer Prize for History-winning works
Vietnam War books
American history books
American political books
Random House books